Lessons in Dissent is a 2014 documentary film about young political activists in Hong Kong.

Synopsis
Lessons in Dissent was filmed over 2011 and 2012 and follows two student activists, Joshua Wong and Ma Jai, as they protest the proposed adoption of the Moral and National Education curriculum for Hong Kong's schools.  They felt the curriculum amounted to brainwashing.  Wong, a secondary school student at the time, is portrayed as a charismatic young leader.  He founded a student group called Scholarism to fight the changes and became famous in his opposition.  Ma Jai, a school drop-out, remained active in the League of Social Democrats as an organiser and protester.  Both were arrested for their efforts but the protests succeeded and that National Education curriculum was made optional.

History
The film was premiered at the 38th Hong Kong International Film Festival on 29 March 2014 and released in theatres a week later on 5 April 2014. It played in theatres in Hong Kong during the summer of 2014.  It gained renewed notoriety during the Umbrella Revolution of the fall of 2014 with Joshua Wong's prominent role.  It was screened at the Mumbai International Film Festival. and the One World film festival in Prague, Czech Republic, March 2015. It has been broadcast on NHK in Japan, PTS in Taiwan and on Movie Movie channel in Hong Kong. It is available to purchase on Amazon, YouTube, and iTunes.

References

External links
Lessons in Dissent on YouTube
IMDb entry

2014 films
Documentary films about politics
Hong Kong documentary films
2014 documentary films
Films about activists
Politics of Hong Kong
Chinese documentary films
2010s Hong Kong films